Loch Lyon (Scottish Gaelic, Loch Lìobhann) is a freshwater loch in Glen Lyon, located in Perthshire, Scotland, which feeds the River Lyon, a tributary of the River Tay. Loch Lyon lies in Glen Lyon, that is the longest enclosed Glen in Scotland, stretching over 30 miles from Fortingall in the east to Loch Lyon in the west. Sir Walter Scott described Glen Lyon as the longest, loneliest and loveliest glen in Scotland.

Reservoir
The original natural loch was much expanded by a hydro-electric dam, part of the North of Scotland Hydro-Electric Board's Breadalbane scheme.

References

Lyon
Lyon
Protected areas of Perth and Kinross
National scenic areas of Scotland
Tay catchment